This is a list of electoral division results for the Australian 2001 federal election in the state of Tasmania.

Overall results

Results by division

Bass

Braddon

Denison

Franklin

Lyons

See also 

 Members of the Australian House of Representatives, 2001–2004

References 

Tasmania 2001